Sony Movies is a Latin American pay television channel that broadcasts movies, is owned by Sony Pictures Entertainment and distributed by Ole Distribution, broadcasts from the Mexico City and Bogotá in Spanish and from São Paulo in Portuguese.

It was launched on July 1, 2022 on Directv and DGO in Latin America and also on pay television providers, and in Brazil under Sky Brasil, UOL, DGO and Claro/NET.

References 

2022 establishments in Brazil
2022 establishments in Colombia
2022 establishments in Mexico
Sony Entertainment Television
Sony Pictures Entertainment
Sony Pictures Television
Television channels and stations established in 2022